Keratin 2A also known as keratin 2E or keratin 2 is a protein that in humans is encoded by the KRT2A gene.

Keratin 2A is a type II cytokeratin. It is found largely in the upper spinous layer of epidermal keratinocytes and mutations in the gene encoding this protein have been associated with ichthyosis bullosa of Siemens.

References

Further reading

External links
 

Keratins